The 2007–08 season was a season of reserve and youth football in Scotland. The season commenced in August 2007.

Scottish Premier Reserve League

Scottish Premier under-19 League

Youth Cup competitions

Scottish Youth Cup

Final

Glasgow Cup

East of Scotland Shield

(This was the 2006-07 edition which, due to scheduling issues, had been held-over unplayed and was thus completed in 2007-08).

National teams

Scotland Under-21 team

Key
 (H) = Home match
 (A) = Away match
 (N) = Neutral venue
 ECQ(6) = European Championship qualifying (Group 6)

Scotland Under-19 team

Key
 (H) = Home match
 (A) = Away match
 (N) = Neutral venue
 ECQ(11) = European Championship qualifying round (Group 11)

Scotland Under-17 team

Key
 (H) = Home match
 (A) = Away match
 (N) = Neutral venue
 ECQ(3) = European Championship qualifying round (Group 3)
 ECQE(5) = European Championship qualifying elite round (Group 5)
 EC(A) = European Championship (Group A)

Notes and references

Youth